This is a list of musicians who have both significant folk and rock elements in their music, even if they are not considered primarily folk rock artists.

Singer-songwriters

1960s North American folk rock vocal groups

British folk rock

Celtic rock

Folk punk

Celtic punk

Uncategorized folk rock

See also
List of folk metal bands

References

Sources

Folk